O. princeps may refer to:
 Ochotona princeps, the American pika, a mammal species found in western North America
 Oscillatoria princeps, a cyanobacterium species in the genus Oscillatoria